Gillian Mary Aldridge  (born 11 November 1946) is the current mayor of the City of Salisbury, Adelaide, South Australia. Aldridge was first elected to the council in 1988, and had served as deputy mayor under Tony Zappia since 2000. Aldridge was elected mayor on 11 March 2008 by-election, and was sworn into office on 25 March 2008. She was re-elected in November 2018.

References

External links
City of Salisbury – The Mayor

1946 births
Living people
Mayors of places in South Australia
Women mayors of places in South Australia
Recipients of the Medal of the Order of Australia
South Australian local councillors
Women local councillors in Australia
Deputy mayors of places in Australia